Yvan Noé (1895–1963) was a French playwright, screenwriter and film director. He was married to the actress Pierrette Caillol who sometimes performed alongside him.

Selected filmography
 Gloria (1931)
 Mademoiselle Mozart (1935)
 The Blue Danube (1940)
 Men Without Fear (1942)
 A Friend Will Come Tonight (1946)
 Secret Cargo (1947)
 Dominique (1950)
 Guilty? (1951)

References

Bibliography
 Jonathan Driskell. The French Screen Goddess: Film Stardom and the Modern Woman in 1930s France. I.B.Tauris, 2015.

External links

1895 births
1963 deaths
French film directors
20th-century French screenwriters
French dramatists and playwrights
Mass media people from Nancy, France
Writers from Nancy, France